Hepu was a vizier of ancient Egypt. He  served during the reign of Thutmose IV.

Family
Hepu's wife is named Rennai. A son is shown in TT66 offering to Hepu and Rennai.

Tomb
Hepu was buried in TT66 in Abd el Qurna in Thebes. The hall contains several scenes and one of them is a text of Hepu's installation as vizier before Thutmose IV.  Another scene depicts the royal workshop with a statue of the King presenting a Djed pillar.

References

Viziers of the Eighteenth Dynasty of Egypt